Mike Nelson is a fictional character in the comedy science fiction television series Mystery Science Theater 3000. Portrayed by actor/head writer Michael J. Nelson, Mike is a likeable temp worker from Little Chute, Wisconsin who comes to work for the mad scientists ("Mads") Dr. Clayton Forrester and TV's Frank in Deep 13 while they prepare for an evil-scientist audit in episode 512, Mitchell.

When Joel Robinson escapes from the Satellite of Love at the end of this episode, the "Mads" knock Mike unconscious and send him up to the satellite to replace Joel as their experimental guinea pig. The hapless Mike finds himself forced to watch bad movies with robot companions Tom Servo and Crow T. Robot while interjecting humorous quips and cultural riffs based on the action and dialog in the films. Nelson's first full appearance was episode 513, The Brain That Wouldn't Die. He typically wore either a dark green jumpsuit, a teal jumpsuit or a blue jumpsuit.

Series creator Joel Hodgson chose Nelson personally as his replacement, on the grounds that Nelson was a natural leader, a gifted comic and that he simply looked good standing next to the show's puppets. Prior to his tenure as host, Nelson played various parody "guest star" characters such as Torgo from Manos: The Hands of Fate, Morrissey, body builder and Hercules star Steve Reeves among others. He continued to play the occasional side character even after he became host. He also occasionally appeared as "Jack Perkins," and continued the persona as host of the syndicated Mystery Science Theater Hour. With 90 episodes, Mike is the longest running host (or second longest if counting the KTMA episodes).

Overview
During his tenure as the show's host, Nelson ended the invention exchanges  (last exchange seen during episode 519, Outlaw) and letter readings (episode 705, Escape 2000) that were a staple of the show's first five years, thus ending two popular segments, but giving the show's writers much more freedom in creating the opening and closing sketches. As co-star and writer Kevin Murphy explained, Nelson is many things "but he's not a tinkerer"; the invention exchanges had in any case been vehicles for Joel to engage in the sort of prop-based comedy he had specialised in before MST3K, and Nelson's strengths lay more in mimicry and the portrayal of various comic characters. Unlike Joel, who was more or less resigned to his fate at being stranded in space, Mike is more desperate and proactive in trying to find a way off of the Satellite of Love, making wild escape attempts during his run of the show. At one point, after seeing a bad Joe Don Baker film, he assumed he would leave as Joel did and boxed himself in a case of Hamdingers (a sort of spam sandwich). However, what he thought was an escape pod was in fact the ship's water heater.

Mike's relationship with the bots was noticeably different from the one they had with Joel. Though they occasionally riffed on Joel, the two bots generally respected him and his authority, often regarding him as a sort of father figure (unsurprising, since he literally created them) who would espouse life-defining lessons that could neither be questioned nor refuted. The bots never felt that way about Mike. Although they quickly came to accept him as their friend and companion, the bots were often annoyed, impatient and even hostile with him (particularly during the Sci-Fi Channel era) when he screwed up or failed to pick up on something that was blatantly obvious to them, or regarding his past, such as dropping out of college (Mike had attended the University of Wisconsin-Stout). If Joel was a father figure, Mike was more like an older brother: though the bots were happy to make fun of him and subject him to  various pranks, they were usually willing to help Mike when in need of aid or advice. Mike was also quite different from Joel in personality and temperament. Joel tended to take his captivity in benign stride, often delivering his riffs in a deadpan manner, holding no apparent malice against his captors and affectionately calling them "the Mads". Mike tended to be more cynical regarding both his captivity and his riffing of the films, and was frequently scheming to escape from the satellite or at least make the Mads look stupid, though he and the bots did share some moments of friendly recognition with later villains Pearl Forrester, Professor Bobo, and Observer.

According to The Mystery Science Theater 3000 Amazing Colossal Guide, Mike is "as intelligent as the average man", and often displays a comic unawareness of his limitations and foibles. In episode #602 Invasion U.S.A., he builds a robot whose only function appears to be to "destroy...destroy...destroy...". During the eighth season, he manages to contribute accidentally to the destruction of planets in three separate incidents. During Mystery Science Theater 3000: The Movie, one of Mike's mistakes was trying to show off by piloting the Satellite of Love, and ended up crashing into the Hubble Space Telescope before totally destroying it while attempting to separate it from the ship. In episode #911 Devil Fish, he believes his identity has been stolen by a secret government agency merely after misplacing his wallet. He has an older brother, Eddie (also played by Nelson), a chain-smoking, hard-drinking bum who replaces him temporarily in the Time Chasers episode due to Crow going back in time to prevent Mike from getting the temp job which eventually results in his confinement on the SOL. However, this also caused Mike to die a horrible death, which was rectified by Crow going back in time once again, to fix things. Mike is also tapped by Pearl Forrester to provide "a little distraction" while she, Bobo, and the Brain Guy evacuate. This leads to Mike building a bomb out of baking soda and vinegar, and while preparing the bomb, he reminisces about other incidents in which he built such bombs (as "harmless pranks") and ends up lost in traumatic memories, overloading the bomb with too much baking soda. The blast subsequently blows up the entire planet, causing Crow to ask, "Are you out of your stupid, rotted skull, you dumb man?!"

In the final episode, Mike and the bots finally return to Earth, not by means of cunning escape but by the stupidity of their captors, who accidentally send the Satellite of Love tumbling back into Earth's atmosphere. The final scenes show Mike and his robot friends sometime later, now living together in a ground-level apartment in Wisconsin, where Mike enjoys a bowl of rice as he sits down to watch The Crawling Eye, which had been the featured film for the very first nationally syndicated episode of the series.

Notes 

Mystery Science Theater 3000 characters
Cultural depictions of actors
Fictional characters from Wisconsin
Fictional con artists
Fictional mass murderers
Fictional prisoners and detainees
Television characters introduced in 1993